Sobemovirus is a genus of viruses. Plants serve as natural hosts. There are 20 species in this genus. Diseases associated with this genus include: mosaics and mottles.

Structure 
Viruses in Sobemovirus are non-enveloped, with icosahedral geometries, and T=3 symmetry. The diameter is around 30 nm.

Genome

The genome is a single piece of linear, positive-sense, single-stranded RNA, 4,100–5,700 nucleotides in length. The genome encodes five open reading frames: ORF1, ORFs 2a and 2b, ORF3 and ORFx.

ORF1 encodes P1 which plays a role in suppression of silencing and virus movement.

ORFs 2a and 2b encode the replicational polyproteins P2a and P2ab. Translation of ORF2a from the genomic RNA is dependent on a leaky scanning mechanism.

ORF3 encodes the coat protein.

ORFx is conserved in all sobemoviruses. It overlaps the 5' end of ORF2a in the +2 reading frame and also extends some distance upstream of ORF2a. It lacks an AUG initiation codon and its expression is predicted to depend on low level initiation at near-cognate non-AUG codons, such as CUG, by a proportion of the ribosomes that are scanning the region between the ORF1 and ORF2a initiation codons. Its function is unknown but it appears to be essential for infection.

Life cycle
Viral replication is cytoplasmic. Entry into the host cell is achieved by penetration into the host cell. Replication follows the positive stranded RNA virus replication model. Positive stranded RNA virus transcription is the method of transcription. Translation takes place by leaky scanning, and  -1 ribosomal frameshifting. The virus exits the host cell by tubule-guided viral movement. Plants serve as the natural host. The virus is transmitted via a vector (CFMV: insects). Transmission routes are vector and seed borne.

Taxonomy 
The genus includes the following species:

Artemisia virus A
Blueberry shoestring virus
Cocksfoot mottle virus
Cymbidium chlorotic mosaic virus
Imperata yellow mottle virus
Lucerne transient streak virus
Papaya lethal yellowing virus
Physalis rugose mosaic virus
Rice yellow mottle virus
Rottboellia yellow mottle virus
Ryegrass mottle virus
Sesbania mosaic virus
Solanum nodiflorum mottle virus
Southern bean mosaic virus
Southern cowpea mosaic virus
Sowbane mosaic virus
Soybean yellow common mosaic virus
Subterranean clover mottle virus
Turnip rosette virus
Velvet tobacco mottle virus

References

External links
 Viralzone: Sobemovirus
 ICTV

Sobemoviruses
Virus genera